Wagneriala is a genus of true bugs belonging to the family Cicadellidae.

The species of this genus are found in Europe.

Species:
 Wagneriala franzi (Wagner, 1955) 
 Wagneriala incisa (Then, 1897)

References

Cicadellidae
Hemiptera genera